Gura Jub-e Morad Beyg (also Romanized as Gūrā Jūb-e Morād Beyg; also known as Gūrājū Morād Bak) is a village in Gurani Rural District, Gahvareh District, Dalahu County, Kermanshah Province, Iran. At the 2006 census, its population was 247, in 70 families.

References 

Populated places in Dalahu County